Honouring individuals with burials and memorials in Westminster Abbey has a long tradition.

History 

Henry III rebuilt Westminster Abbey in honour of the Royal Saint Edward the Confessor, whose relics were placed in a shrine in the sanctuary and now lie in a burial vault beneath the 1268 Cosmati mosaic pavement, in front of the high altar. Henry III himself was interred nearby in a chest tomb with effigial monument. Many of the Plantagenet kings of England, their wives and other relatives, were also buried in the abbey. From the time of Edward the Confessor, until the death of George II in 1760, most kings and queens of England were buried here, although there are exceptions (most notably Edward IV, Henry VIII and Charles I, who are buried in St George's Chapel, Windsor Castle). All monarchs who died after George II were buried in Windsor; most were laid to rest in St George's Chapel, although Queen Victoria and Edward VIII are buried at Frogmore, where the royal family has a private cemetery.

Since the Middle Ages, aristocrats were buried inside chapels, while monks and other people associated with the abbey were buried in the cloisters and other areas. One of these was Geoffrey Chaucer, who was employed as master of the King's Works and had apartments in the abbey. Other poets, writers and musicians were buried or memorialised around Chaucer in what became known as the Poets' Corner. These include: W. H. Auden, William Blake, Lord Byron, Charles Dickens, John Dryden, George Eliot, T. S. Eliot, Thomas Gray, Gerard Manley Hopkins, Samuel Johnson, John Keats, Rudyard Kipling, Jenny Lind, John Masefield, John Milton, Laurence Olivier, Alexander Pope, Nicholas Rowe, Percy Bysshe Shelley, Thomas Shadwell, Alfred Tennyson and William Wordsworth. Abbey musicians such as Henry Purcell were also buried in their place of work.

Subsequently, it became one of Britain's most significant honours to be buried or commemorated here.

The practice of burying national figures in the abbey began under Oliver Cromwell with the burial of Admiral Robert Blake, in 1657. The practice spread to include generals, admirals, politicians, doctors and scientists such as Sir Isaac Newton, buried on 4 April 1727 and Charles Darwin, buried on 19 April 1882.

British Prime Ministers buried in the abbey are: William Pitt the Elder, William Pitt the Younger, George Canning, Viscount Palmerston, William Ewart Gladstone, Bonar Law, Neville Chamberlain and Clement Attlee.

During the early 20th century, for reasons of space, it became increasingly common to bury cremated remains rather than coffins. In 1905, the actor Sir Henry Irving was cremated and his ashes buried in the abbey, thereby becoming the first person ever to be cremated prior to interment. This marked a milestone as after the death of Sir Joseph Dalton Hooker in December 1911, the Dean and Chapter of Westminster Abbey chose to offer Hooker a grave near Charles Darwin's in the nave, but also insisted that he be cremated before. His widow however declined and so Hooker's body was buried in the churchyard of St Anne's Church, Kew. The majority of interments are of cremated remains, but some burials still take place – Frances Challen, wife of the Rev. Sebastian Charles, Canon of Westminster, was buried alongside her husband in the south choir aisle in 2014. Members of the Percy family have a family vault, "The Northumberland Vault", in St Nicholas's Chapel, within the abbey. The ashes of physicist Stephen Hawking were interred in the Abbey on 15 June 2018, near the grave of Sir Isaac Newton. The memorial stone, bearing the inscription 'Here lies what was mortal of Stephen Hawking 1942–2018', includes a form of the Bekenstein–Hawking entropy equation relating to black holes.

In the floor just inside the great west door, in the centre of the nave, is the tomb of The Unknown Warrior, an unidentified British soldier killed on a European battlefield during the First World War. He was buried in the abbey on 11 November 1920. There are many graves in the floors, but this is the only grave on which it is forbidden to walk.

Burials
 See also: :Category:Burials at Westminster Abbey

British monarchs and consorts

The following English, Scottish and British monarchs and consorts are buried in the abbey:
 Edward the Confessor, King of England, in 1066
 Edith of Wessex, Queen consort of England; wife of Edward the Confessor
 Henry III, King of England
 Eleanor of Castile, Queen consort of England, in 1290 (viscera at Lincoln Cathedral and heart at Blackfriars, London); wife of Edward I
 Edward I, King of England, in 1307
 Philippa of Hainault, Queen consort of England, in 1370; wife of Edward III
 Edward III, King of England, in 1377
 Anne of Bohemia, Queen consort of England, in 1394; wife of Richard II
 Richard II, King of England, in 1413 (reburial from King's Langley Priory)
 Henry V, King of England, in 1422
 Catherine of Valois, Queen consort of England; wife of Henry V
 Possibly the Princes in the Tower (Edward V, King of England, and his younger brother, Richard of Shrewsbury, Duke of York), sons of Edward IV and Elizabeth Woodville
 Anne Neville, Queen consort of England, in 1485; wife of Edward of Westminster, Prince of Wales and Richard III
 Elizabeth of York, Queen consort of England, in 1503; wife of Henry VII
 Henry VII, King of England, in 1509
 Edward VI, King of England, in 1553
 Anne of Cleves, Queen consort of England, in 1557; fourth wife of Henry VIII
 Mary I, Queen of England, in 1558
 Mary, Queen of Scotland and Queen dowager of France, in 1612 (reburial from Peterborough Cathedral); mother of James VI and I
 Elizabeth I, Queen of England, in 1603
 Anne of Denmark, Queen consort of England and Scotland, in 1619; wife of James VI and I
 James VI and I, King of England and Scotland, in 1625
 Charles II, King of England and Scotland, in 1685
 Mary II, Queen of England and Scotland, in 1695
 William III, King of England and Scotland, in 1702
 Prince George of Denmark, Duke of Cumberland, in 1708; husband of Anne, Queen of Great Britain
 Anne, Queen of Great Britain, in 1714
 Caroline of Ansbach, Queen consort of Great Britain, in 1737; wife of George II
 George II, King of Great Britain, in 1760

Other royal relatives
 Edmund Crouchback, Earl of Leicester and Lancaster, in 1301; son of Henry III and Eleanor of Provence
 Katherine of England; daughter of Henry III and Eleanor of Provence
 Henry of England, in 1274; son of Edward I and Eleanor of Castile
 Alphonso of England, Earl of Chester, in 1284 (heart at Blackfriars, London); son of Edward I and Eleanor of Castile
 Eleanor of England, Countess of Bar, in 1298; daughter of Edward I and Eleanor of Castile
 John of Eltham, Earl of Cornwall, in 1337; son of Edward II and Isabella of France
 Elizabeth Tudor, in 1495; daughter of Henry VII and Elizabeth of York
 Edmund Tudor, Duke of Somerset, in 1500; son of Henry VII and Elizabeth of York
 Lady Margaret Beaufort, Countess of Richmond and Derby; mother of Henry VII
 Henry Tudor, Duke of Cornwall, in 1511; son of Henry VIII and Catherine of Aragon
 Charles Stuart, 1st Earl of Lennox; great-grandson of Henry VII and paternal uncle to James VI and I
 Lady Margaret Douglas, Countess of Lennox; daughter of Margaret Tudor and Archibald Douglas, 6th Earl of Angus
Henry Frederick Stuart, Prince of Wales, in 1612; son of James VI and I and Anne of Denmark
 Lady Arbella Stuart; great-great-granddaughter of Henry VII and paternal cousin to James VI and I
Charles James Stuart, Duke of Cornwall; infant son of Charles I and Henrietta Maria of France
Anne Stuart, in 1640; infant daughter of Charles I and Henrietta Maria of France
Mary Stuart, Princess Royal and Princess consort of Orange, in 1660; daughter of Charles I and Henrietta Maria of France; mother of William III
Henry Stuart, Duke of Gloucester, in 1660; son of Charles I and Henrietta Maria of France
Charles Stuart, Duke of Cambridge, in 1661; son of James II and Anne Hyde
 Elizabeth Stuart, Electress consort of the Palatinate and Queen consort of Bohemia, in 1662; daughter of James VI and I and Anne of Denmark; grandmother of George I
James Stuart, Duke of Cambridge, in 1667; son of James II and Anne Hyde
Charles Stuart, Duke of Kendal, in 1667; son of James II and Anne Hyde
Anne (née Hyde), Duchess of York and Albany, in 1671; first wife of James II
Edgar Stuart, Duke of Cambridge, in 1671; son of James II and Anne Hyde
 Prince Rupert of the Rhine, Duke of Cumberland, in 1682; son of Elizabeth Stuart and Frederick V, Elector Palatine of the Rhine
 Prince William, Duke of Gloucester, in 1700; son of Anne, Queen of Great Britain and Prince George of Denmark
 Other infant children of Anne, Queen of Great Britain
Prince George William of Great Britain, in 1718; infant son of George II and Caroline of Ansbach
 Frederick, Prince of Wales, in 1751; son of George II and Caroline of Ansbach; father of George III
Princess Caroline of Great Britain, in 1758; daughter of George II and Caroline of Ansbach
Princess Elizabeth of Great Britain, in 1759; daughter of Frederick, Prince of Wales and Augusta of Saxe-Gotha-Altenburg
 Prince William, Duke of Cumberland, in 1765; son of George II and Caroline of Ansbach
Prince Frederick of Great Britain, in 1766; son of Frederick, Prince of Wales and Augusta of Saxe-Gotha-Altenburg
Prince Edward, Duke of York and Albany, in 1767; son of Frederick, Prince of Wales and Augusta of Saxe-Gotha-Altenburg
Princess Louisa of Great Britain, in 1768; daughter of Frederick, Prince of Wales and Augusta of Saxe-Gotha-Altenburg
Augusta of Saxe-Gotha-Altenburg, Princess of Wales, in 1772; wife of Frederick, Prince of Wales
Prince Alfred of Great Britain, in 1782 (later moved to St George's Chapel, Windsor Castle); son of George III and Charlotte of Mecklenburg-Strelitz
 Prince Octavius of Great Britain, in 1783 (later moved to St. George's Chapel, Windsor Castle); son of George III and Charlotte of Mecklenburg-Strelitz
 Princess Amelia of Great Britain, in 1786; daughter of George II and Caroline of Ansbach
 Prince Henry, Duke of Cumberland and Strathearn, in 1790; son of Frederick, Prince of Wales and Augusta of Saxe-Gotha-Altenburg

Nave
The following are buried in the nave:
 Field Marshal Edmund Allenby, 1st Viscount Allenby
 John André
 The Right Reverend Francis Atterbury, Bishop of Rochester
 Clement Attlee, 1st Earl Attlee
 Sir Charles Barry
 Ernest Bevin
 Angela Burdett-Coutts, 1st Baroness Burdett-Coutts
 Neville Chamberlain

 Admiral of the Red Thomas Cochrane, 10th Earl of Dundonald and Marquess of Maranhão
 Vice Admiral Charles Cornewall
 Charles Darwin
 Joost de Blank, Archbishop of Cape Town
 Freeman Freeman-Thomas, 1st Marquess of Willingdon
 George Graham
 Stephen Hawking
 Sir John Herschel, 1st Baronet
 Benjamin "Ben" Jonson (buried upright)
Andrew Bonar Law
 David Livingstone (heart buried in Zambia)
 Sir Charles Lyell, 1st Baronet
 Sir Isaac Newton
 Field Marshal Herbert Plumer, 1st Viscount Plumer
 Ernest Rutherford, 1st Baron Rutherford of Nelson
 Sir George Gilbert Scott
 Robert Stephenson
 Ludovic Stewart, 2nd Duke of Lennox and 1st Duke of Richmond
 George Edmund Street
 Sir Joseph John "J.J." Thomson
 William Thomson, 1st Baron Kelvin
 Thomas Tompion
 The Unknown Warrior (entombed in 1920)
 Beatrice Webb, Baroness Passfield
 Sidney Webb, 1st Baron Passfield

North Transept

The following are buried in the North Transept:
 George Canning
 Charles Canning, 1st Earl Canning
 William Pitt the Elder, 1st Earl of Chatham
 Charles James Fox
 William Ewart Gladstone
 Henry Grattan
 William Pitt the Younger
 Major General Sir John Malcolm
 David Murray, 2nd Earl of Mansfield and 7th Viscount of Stormont
 William Murray, 1st Earl of Mansfield
 Theodore Paleologus II
 Robert Stewart, 2nd Marquess of Londonderry
 Henry John Temple, 3rd Viscount Palmerston
 Sir Hugh Vaughan
 William Wilberforce

South Transept

The following are buried in the South Transept which is known as the Poets' Corner:
 Robert Adam
 Robert Browning
 William Camden
 Thomas Campbell
 Geoffrey Chaucer
 William Congreve
 Abraham Cowley
 Sir William Davenant
 Sir John Denham
 Charles Dickens
 Michael Drayton
 John Dryden
 Adam Fox
 David Garrick
 John Gay
 Gabriel Goodman
 George Frideric Handel
 Thomas Hardy (heart buried in Stinsford)
 Sir Henry Irving
 Samuel Johnson
 Rudyard Kipling
 Thomas Babington Macaulay, 1st Baron Macaulay
 John Masefield
 Anne Oldfield
 Laurence Olivier, Baron Olivier
 Thomas "Old Tom" Parr
 Richard Brinsley Sheridan
 Edmund Spenser
 Alfred Tennyson, 1st Baron Tennyson

Cloisters

The following are buried in the Cloisters:
 Edmund Ayrton
 Aphra Behn
 General John Burgoyne
 Muzio Clementi
 Benjamin Cooke
 Robert Cooke
 Percival "Percy" Dearmer
 Laurence of Durham, Abbot c. 1158 – 1173
 Ian Fraser, Baron Fraser of Lonsdale
 Jeremy Heywood, Baron Heywood of Whitehall
 William de Humez, Abbot 1214 – 1222
 Howard Nixon
 John Parsons
 Johann Peter Salomon
 William Shield
 Herbert Thorndike
 John Thorndike
 William Turner
 James Wright

North Choir Aisle

The following are buried in the North Choir Aisle:
 John Blow
 Henry Purcell
 Almeric de Courcy, 23rd Baron Kingsale
 John Robinson
 Admiral Sir Edward Spragge
 Ralph Vaughan Williams
 Sir William Sterndale Bennett

South Choir Aisle
The following are buried in the South Choir Aisle:
 Andrew Bell
 James Kendall
 Sir Paul Methuen
 Admiral of the Fleet Sir Cloudesley Shovell
 Dame Sybil Thorndike, Lady Casson
 Charles Whitworth, 1st Baron Whitworth

Ambulatory chapels
The following are buried in the ambulatory chapels:

St. John the Baptist Chapel
 Thomas Cecil, 1st Earl of Exeter
 Dorothy Cecil, Countess of Exeter; first wife of Thomas Cecil and daughter of John Neville, 4th Baron Latimer

St. Nicholas' Chapel
Northumberland Vault:
 George Seymour, Viscount Beauchamp; only son of Algernon Seymour, 7th Duke of Somerset
 General Algernon Seymour, 7th Duke of Somerset
 Frances Seymour, Duchess of Somerset; wife of Algernon Seymour, 7th Duke of Somerset and paternal granddaughter of Thomas Thynne, 1st Viscount Weymouth
 Lady Elizabeth Percy; only daughter of Hugh Percy, 1st Duke of Northumberland
 Elizabeth Percy, Duchess of Northumberland and 2nd Baroness Percy; wife of Hugh Percy, 1st Duke of Northumberland and daughter of Algernon Seymour, 7th Duke of Somerset
 Elizabeth Percy; second daughter of Algernon Percy, 1st Earl of Beverley
 Lady Charlotte Percy; eldest daughter of Hugh Percy, 2nd Duke of Northumberland
 Hugh Percy, 1st Duke of Northumberland
 Lord Henry Percy; second son of Hugh Percy, 2nd Duke of Northumberland
 Lady Louisa Percy; fifth daughter of Algernon Percy, 1st Earl of Beverley
 Hon. Algernon Percy; eldest son of George Percy, 5th Duke of Northumberland
 Hon. Henry Percy; second son of George Percy, 5th Duke of Northumberland
 Hon. Margaret Percy; second daughter of George Percy, 5th Duke of Northumberland
 Isabella Percy, Countess of Beverley; wife of Algernon Percy, 1st Earl of Beverley and daughter of Peter Burrell; sister of Frances Percy, Duchess of Northumberland
 Lieutenant General Hugh Percy, 2nd Duke of Northumberland
 Lady Elizabeth Percy; second daughter of Hugh Percy, 2nd Duke of Northumberland
 Frances Percy, Duchess of Northumberland; second wife of Hugh Percy, 2nd Duke of Northumberland and daughter of Peter Burrell; sister of Isabella Percy, Countess of Beverley
 Hugh Percy, 3rd Duke of Northumberland
 Lady Agnes Buller; wife of Major General Frederick Thomas Buller and twin sister of Hugh Percy, 3rd Duke of Northumberland
 Admiral Algernon Percy, 4th Duke of Northumberland
 Charlotte Percy, Duchess of Northumberland; wife of the Hugh Percy, 3rd Duke of Northumberland and daughter of Edward Clive, 1st Earl of Powis; governess of Princess Alexandrina Victoria of Kent (the future Queen Victoria)
 George Percy, 5th Duke of Northumberland
 General Lord Henry Percy; fifth son of George Percy, 5th Duke of Northumberland and recipient of the Victoria Cross
 Lady Louisa Percy; eldest daughter of George Percy, 5th Duke of Northumberland
 Louisa Percy, Duchess of Northumberland; wife of Algernon Percy, 6th Duke of Northumberland and daughter of Henry Drummond
 Algernon Percy, 6th Duke of Northumberland
 Alan Percy, 8th Duke of Northumberland
 Helen Percy, Duchess of Northumberland; wife of Alan Percy, 8th Duke of Northumberland and daughter of Charles Gordon-Lennox, 7th Duke of Richmond
 Hugh Percy, 10th Duke of Northumberland
 Elizabeth Percy, Duchess of Northumberland (ashes); wife of Hugh Percy, 10th Duke of Northumberland and daughter of Walter Montagu Douglas Scott, 8th Duke of Buccleuch; paternal niece of Princess Alice, Duchess of Gloucester

St Paul's Chapel
 Katherine Percy, Countess of Northumberland; wife of Henry Percy, 8th Earl of Northumberland and daughter of John Neville, 4th Baron Latimer
 Sir Lewis de Robessart, Baron Bourchier
Elizabeth Bourchier, 4th Baroness Bourchier

Other ambulatory chapels
 Sir Robert Aytoun
 Eleanor de Bohun, Duchess of Gloucester
 Lionel Cranfield, 1st Earl of Middlesex
 Sir Rowland Hill
Frances, Lady Ingram; wife of Sir Thomas Ingram and daughter of Thomas Belasyse, 1st Viscount Fauconberg
Mary Ingram; daughter of Sir Thomas Ingram
Sir Thomas Ingram
 Simon Langham
 Edward Talbot, 8th Earl of Shrewsbury
 William de Valence, 1st Earl of Pembroke
 George Villiers, 1st Duke of Buckingham
 Katherine Villiers, Duchess of Buckingham and 18th Baroness de Ros of Helmsley; wife of George Villiers, 1st Duke of Buckingham and daughter of Francis Manners, 6th Earl of Rutland

Henry VII's Lady Chapel
The following are buried in the Henry VII's Chapel:

 Antoine Philippe d'Orléans, Duke of Montpensier; brother of Louis Philippe I of France
 Joseph Addison (a white marble statue in Poets' Corner)
 Air Chief Marshal Hugh Dowding, 1st Baron Dowding
 George Monck, 1st Duke of Albemarle
 George Savile, 1st Marquess of Halifax
 Marshal of the Royal Air Force Hugh Trenchard, 1st Viscount Trenchard
 Major General Charles Worsley (no memorial remains)

Unknown location
 Sir Arthur Ingram (omission from the main burial register during the English Civil War)

Memorials
The following are commemorated in the abbey and/or had their memorial service in the abbey, but were buried elsewhere:

Individuals

 Christopher Anstey — buried at St. Swithin's Church, Bath, Somerset
 Dame Peggy Ashcroft — cremated at Golders Green Crematorium, London; ashes scattered in the Great Garden at New Place, Stratford-upon-Avon, Warwickshire
 Wystan Hugh "W. H." Auden — buried in Kirchstetten, Austria
 Jane Austen — buried in Winchester Cathedral, Hampshire
 Lieutenant General Robert Baden-Powell, 1st Baron Baden-Powell — buried in alongside the ashes of his wife, Olave Baden-Powell, Baroness Baden-Powell, in Nyeri, Kenya
 Stanley Baldwin, 1st Earl Baldwin of Bewdley — cremated at Golders Green Crematorium, London; ashes buried in Worcester Cathedral, Worcestershire
 Admiral Robert Blake — initially buried in the abbey, but moved to St Margaret's, Westminster in 1661
 William Booth — buried in Abney Park Cemetery, Stoke Newington, London
 Sir Adrian Boult — body willed to science
 Benjamin Britten, Baron Britten of Aldeburgh — buried at St Peter and St Paul's Church, Aldeburgh, Suffolk
 Charlotte and Emily Brontë — buried in the family vault at St Michael and All Angels' Church, Haworth, West Yorkshire; Anne Brontë is buried in at St Mary's Church, Scarborough, North Yorkshire
 George Byron, 6th Baron Byron — buried at the Church of St Mary Magdalene, Hucknall, Nottinghamshire
 Sir Henry Campbell-Bannerman — buried in Meigle, Perthshire
 Sir Winston Churchill — buried at St Martin's Church, Bladon, Oxfordshire
 John Clare — buried at St Botolph's Church, Helpston, Cambridgeshire
 Captain James Cornewall — buried at sea off Toulon; his monument was the first ever to be erected by Parliament at public expense
 Captain Edward Cooke — buried in Calcutta, India
 Sir Noël Coward — buried on the grounds of his home, Firefly Estate, Jamaica
 William Cowper — honoured with a stained glass window unveiled by George William Childs in 1875; buried in the St Thomas of Canterbury Chapel, at St Nicholas's Church, East Dereham, Norfolk
 Oliver Cromwell — body buried at Tyburn, Marylebone and head buried at Sidney Sussex College, Cambridge
 Diana, Princess of Wales — buried at Althorp, West Northamptonshire
 Richard Dimbleby — ashes buried at St. Peter's Church, Linchmere, West Sussex
 Paul Dirac — buried in Tallahassee, Florida
 Benjamin Disraeli, 1st Earl of Beaconsfield — buried at the Church of St. Michael and All Angels,  Hughenden Manor, Buckinghamshire
 Sir Francis Drake, buried at sea off Portobelo, Panama
 Sir Edward Elgar, 1st Baronet — buried at St Wulstan's Roman Catholic Church, Little Malvern, Worcestershire
 Howard Florey, Baron Florey — buried in Marston, Oxfordshire
 Sir John Franklin — presumably buried at sea near King William Island, Canada

 Robert Gascoyne-Cecil, 3rd Marquess of Salisbury — buried at St Etheldreda's Church, Hatfield
 Sir John Gielgud — ashes scattered in the garden of his home in Wotton Underwood, Buckinghamshire
 Adam Lindsay Gordon — buried in Australia
 George Green — buried in Nottingham
 John Harrison — buried at St. John's Church, Hampstead, London
 Philip Larkin — buried at the Cottingham Municipal Cemetery, East Riding of Yorkshire
 The Reverend Evelyn Levett Sutton, Prebendary of Westminster and Chaplain to the House of Commons (collapsed after reading the ninth commandment during Sunday services and died the next day)
 Clive Staples "C. S." Lewis — buried at Holy Trinity Church, Headington, Oxfordshire
 Jenny Lind — buried at the Great Malvern Cemetery, Worcestershire
 David Lloyd George, 1st Earl Lloyd-George of Dwyfor — buried beside the River Dwyfor in Llanystumdwy, Gwynedd
 Henry Wadsworth Longfellow — buried in the Mount Auburn Cemetery, Cambridge, Massachusetts
 George Herbert — honoured in a stained glass window unveiled by George William Childs in 1875

 James Ramsay MacDonald — ashes buried at Holy Trinity Church, Spynie, Moray, Scotland
 John A. Macdonald — buried in Cataraqui Cemetery, Kingston, Ontario
 Sir Robert Menzies — ashes buried in the "Prime Ministers Garden" at Melbourne General Cemetery, Victoria, Australia
 Admiral of the Fleet Louis Mountbatten, 1st Earl Mountbatten of Burma — buried in Romsey Abbey, Hampshire
 Pasquale Paoli — buried at Morosaglia, Corsica
 Admiral Arthur Phillip — buried at Church of St Nicholas, Bathampton, Somerset
 Franklin D. Roosevelt — buried at Home of Franklin D. Roosevelt National Historic Site, Hyde Park, New York
 William Shakespeare — buried at Church of the Holy Trinity, Stratford-upon-Avon, Warwickshire
 Dylan Thomas — buried at St. Martin's Church, Laugharne, Wales
 Rear Admiral Thomas Totty — buried at Portsmouth Garrison Chapel, Old Portsmouth, Hampshire
 Lieutenant General William Villettes — buried in Kingston, Jamaica
 The Reverend Charles Wesley — buried at St Marylebone Parish Church, London
 The Reverend John Wesley — buried at Wesley's Chapel, London
 Oscar Wilde — honoured in a stained glass window unveiled in 1995; buried in the Père Lachaise Cemetery, Paris
 Major General James Wolfe — buried at St Alfege Church, Greenwich, London

World War I poets
Sixteen Great War poets are commemorated on a slate stone unveiled on 11 November 1985, in the South Transept (Poets' Corner):

 Richard Aldington — buried in Sury, Ardennes, France
 Laurence Binyon (author of "For the Fallen") — buried in Reading, Berkshire
 Edmund Blunden — buried in Holy Trinity Church, Long Melford, Suffolk
 Rupert Brooke (author of "The Soldier") — buried in Skyros, Greece
 Wilfrid Gibson (one of the Georgian poets)
 Robert Graves (author of "I, Claudius" and the only poet of the sixteen, still alive at the time of the commemoration) — buried in Deià, Mallorca, Spain
 Captain Julian Grenfell — buried in Boulogne Eastern Cemetery, Boulogne-sur-Mer, Pas-de-Calais, France
 Ivor Gurney — buried in St Matthew's Church, Twigworth, Gloucestershire
 David Jones — buried in the Ladywell and Brockley Cemetery, Lewisham, London
 Robert Nichols — buried in St Mary's Church, Lawford, Essex
 Second Lieutenant Wilfred Owen (author of "Dulce et Decorum est" and "Anthem for Doomed Youth", and recipient of the Military Cross) — buried in the Ors Communal Cemetery, Ors, Northern France
 Sir Herbert Read — buried in Stonegrave, North Yorkshire
 Isaac Rosenberg — buried in the Bailleul Road East Cemetery, Saint-Laurent-Blangy, Pas-de-Calais, France
 Captain Siegfried Sassoon — buried at St Andrew's Church, Mells, Somerset
 Captain Charles Sorley — also commemorated at the Loos Memorial, in France
 Corporal Edward Thomas — buried in the Commonwealth War Graves Cemetery, Agny, France

20th-century martyrs

Above the Great West Door, ten 20th-century Christian martyrs from across the world are depicted in statues; from left to right:
  Maximilian Kolbe
  Manche Masemola
  Janani Luwum
  Grand Duchess Elizabeth Feodorovna
  Martin Luther King Jr.
  Óscar Romero
  Dietrich Bonhoeffer
  Esther John
  Lucian Tapiedi
  Wang Zhiming

Formerly buried (removed)
Harold I of England was originally buried in the abbey, but his body was exhumed, beheaded, and thrown into a fen, in June 1040. The body was later rescued and re-buried in the church of St. Clement Danes, Westminster.

A number of Cromwellians were also buried in the Abbey, but later removed, on the orders of Charles II, and buried in a pit in St Margaret's churchyard, adjoining the abbey. A modern plaque on the exterior wall of the church records the names of those who were disinterred:
 Oliver Cromwell, Lord Protector
 Admiral Robert Blake
 John Pym

Marie Joséphine of Savoy, titular Queen of France and wife of Louis XVIII of France, died in exile in England in 1810 and was buried in the Lady Chapel. In 1811, under her husband's orders, her body was exhumed and removed to Cagliari Cathedral, Sardinia.

In November 1869, at the request of the Dean of Westminster and with the approval of Queen Victoria, the philanthropist George Peabody was given a temporary burial in the abbey, but was later moved and buried in Salem, Massachusetts.

Proposed burials and memorials
 Thomas Carlyle burial: Upon Carlyle's death in 1881, Arthur Penrhyn Stanley made an offer of burial in Westminster Abbey. Carlyle had anticipated and rejected this, taking issue with the Church of England's burial service as well as the spectacle of the event, saying that "Westminster Abbey would require a general gaol delivery of rogues before any man could be at peace there". In accordance with his will, he was buried with his family in Hoddam, Scotland.
 Richard III burial: After the discovery of Richard III's remains in September 2012, a controversy arose as to whether or not he should be interred at Westminster Abbey or some other suitable location. His remains were ultimately buried in Leicester Cathedral. 
 Captain Sir Thomas "Tom" Moore memorial: Following his death in February 2021, TV presenter Carol Vorderman suggested Moore should have a memorial stone placed in Westminster Abbey, in recognition of his fundraising efforts in the run up to his 100th birthday during the COVID-19 pandemic.

References

Notes

Religion in the City of Westminster
Westminster Abbey
 
World Heritage Sites in London
Monuments and memorials in London
Burial sites of British royal houses
Burial sites of the House of Stuart
Burial sites of the Pitt family
Burial sites of the House of Stewart of Darnley
Burial sites of the House of Orange-Nassau
Burial sites of the House of Tudor
Burial sites of the House of Hanover